Daniel Linn Gooch (October 28, 1853 – April 12, 1913) was a U.S. Representative from Kentucky and businessman.

Born in Rumsey, McLean County, Kentucky, Gooch attended a private school.
After entering the pharmaceutical industry at the age of seventeen, he subsequently became president of a large wholesale drug and chemical company.

Gooch was elected as a Democrat to the 57th and 58th Congresses, between March 4, 1901, and March 3, 1905.
He was an unsuccessful candidate for renomination in 1904, henceforth retiring from public life.

Gooch died in Covington, Kentucky, on April 12, 1913.
He was interred in Woodlawn Cemetery, Dayton, Ohio.

References

1853 births
1913 deaths
Democratic Party members of the United States House of Representatives from Kentucky
19th-century American politicians